Malka Mari National Park is a national park of Kenya, situated along the Dawa River on the Kenya-Ethiopia border. It is accessible via the Mandera Airport, and is probably the least visited national park in the nation.

The park is mostly semi-arid bushland and scrubby grassland with riparian woodland and along the river. There are plants in the park that are unique to the area.

Some of the animals that live in the park are the Somali giraffe, crocodile, hyena, agama lizards, antelopes, vultures, dik-dik, Nile crocodiles, zebra and genet.

Over 20 species of birds can be found here, including streptopelia decipiens, cichladusa guttata, ploceus dichrocephalus and the rare corvus ruficollis (desert crow).

Malka Mari is an IUCN Category II park designated in 1989.

References

North Eastern Province (Kenya)
National parks of Kenya
Protected areas established in 1989
IUCN Category II
Somali Acacia-Commiphora bushlands and thickets